Dumb and Dumber is a series of comedy films starring Jim Carrey and Jeff Daniels. The films have been released from 1994 to 2014.

Films

Dumb and Dumber (1994)

The first film was released on December 16, 1994. Despite receiving mixed reviews from critics, it was a commercial success and developed a cult following in the years since its release. The success of Dumb and Dumber launched the career of the Farrelly brothers and solidified Carrey's. The film follows the characters of Harry and Lloyd as they travel across the country to Aspen to return a briefcase.

Dumb and Dumberer: When Harry Met Lloyd (2003)

In 2003, a prequel was theatrically released, entitled Dumb and Dumberer: When Harry Met Lloyd. The film featured a cast and crew different from the previous film, and the Farrelly brothers had no involvement in the film's production. It was panned by critics, receiving a 10% rating on Rotten Tomatoes. It was only a minor box office success, grossing approximately $39.2 million worldwide against a $19 million budget, as opposed to the original film's far greater $247 million worldwide gross against a $16-17 million budget.

Dumb and Dumber To (2014)

Farrelly brothers returned to make a sequel to Dumb and Dumber. Carrey and Daniels returned to lead the film, and Bobby and Peter Farrelly returned to direct along with original screenwriter Bennett Yellin, and actors reprising their roles from the first film include Brady Bluhm, who played Billy in (Apartment) 4C, and Cam Neely, who played Sea Bass. Dumb and Dumber To was released on November 14, 2014.

Unlike the original film, Dumb and Dumber To was not released by Warner Bros. but rather by Universal Pictures. Despite Warner having no involvement in the film, its New Line Cinema division, which produced the first film and the prequel, was still given studio credit from Universal.

Television

Dumb and Dumber (1995–1996)

In 1995, a Hanna-Barbera-produced animated series aired on ABC, as part of its Saturday morning cartoon lineup; Matt Frewer provided the voice of Lloyd, while Bill Fagerbakke voiced Harry. In the cartoon, Harry and Lloyd have reacquired their van, now named "Otto". The cartoon also features a new character, Kitty, a female pet purple beaver who appears to be smarter than both men. The animated series was written by Bennett Yellin, co-writer of the film. The show was short-lived and was shelved after one season.

Cast and characters
 A  indicates an actor or actress portraying a younger version of the character.
 A  indicates the actor or actress was uncredited for their respective role.

Reception

Box office performance

Critical and public response

Music

Singles

Crash Test Dummies – "The Ballad of Peter Pumpkinhead"

The song was covered by Canadian group Crash Test Dummies in 1994 for the soundtrack to the film Dumb and Dumber. Crash Test Dummies' version is notable in that it was their first of two singles to feature Ellen Reid on lead vocals; it differs slightly from XTC's version, omitting the second verse. The video was filmed in Nathan Phillips Square, home to City Hall, in Toronto, Ontario; fans of the band were invited to an open casting by VJs on MuchMusic.

It features Jeff Daniels reprising his role of Harry Dunne from Dumb and Dumber. In the video, Harry falls and gets a Jack-o'-lantern stuck on his head. In his struggle to get it off, he foils a bank robbery and becomes a media sensation. However, he is unfairly found guilty of the bank robbery and narrowly avoids being hanged (he is saved by the pumpkin, which is placed on his head before he's put in the noose). It ends with a spoof of the religious imagery in the original video, as Harry's followers (oblivious to him having survived) venerate him as a martyr and establish the "Church of the Latter-Day Pumpkinheads" where they don Jack-o'-lantern masks, ape Harry's struggle to remove the pumpkin stuck to his head, and take communion of pumpkin seeds and wine sipped from a pumpkin stem.

References

External links

 
 
 
 
 
 

American slapstick comedy films
 
American screwball comedy films
Comedy film franchises
Film series introduced in 1994
New Line Cinema franchises
Universal Pictures franchises
Films adapted into television shows